Nicolas-Guy Turbide (born January 12, 1997) is a Canadian Paralympic swimmer who has albinism. He is a two-time Paralympic medallist, a Commonwealth Games champion, a triple Parapan American Games champion and a World silver medallist in the 100m backstroke.

Career
Turbide was named Male Para Swimmer of the Year by Swimming Canada in 2016 and 2018 and was named co-winner in 2019. He was  awarded the Medal of the National Assembly by the National Assembly of Quebec in 2016.

Named to the Canadian team for the 2022 Commonwealth Games, Turbide won gold in the 50 m freestyle S13 on the second day of competition, setting a new Games and Canadian record of 24.32 seconds. He said he "executed the race plan exactly the way I wanted to."

References

External links
 
 

1997 births
Living people
French Quebecers
Paralympic swimmers of Canada
Swimmers from Quebec City
Swimmers at the 2016 Summer Paralympics
Swimmers at the 2020 Summer Paralympics
Medalists at the 2016 Summer Paralympics
Medalists at the 2020 Summer Paralympics
Medalists at the World Para Swimming Championships
Paralympic medalists in swimming
Paralympic silver medalists for Canada
Paralympic bronze medalists for Canada
Medalists at the 2015 Parapan American Games
Canadian male backstroke swimmers
Canadian male freestyle swimmers
Canadian male butterfly swimmers
Canadian male medley swimmers
S13-classified Paralympic swimmers
Swimmers at the 2022 Commonwealth Games
Commonwealth Games medallists in swimming
Commonwealth Games gold medallists for Canada
Medallists at the 2022 Commonwealth Games